Lozoya is a municipality in the Community of Madrid, Spain.

It may also refer to:

People 
Emilio Lozoya Austin (born 1974), Mexican economist and politician
Emilio Lozoya Thalmann (born 1948), Mexican economist and politician
Jesús Lozoya Solís (1910–1983), Mexican military physician, pediatrician and politician
Jorge Alberto Lozoya (born 1943), Mexican diplomat
Luis Lozoya (born 1993), Mexican footballer
Melitón Lozoya, a co-conspirator in Pancho Villa's assassination

Municipalities
Berzosa del Lozoya, a municipality in the Community of Madrid, Spain
Buitrago del Lozoya, a municipality in the Community of Madrid, Spain
Gargantilla del Lozoya y Pinilla de Buitrago, a municipality in the Community of Madrid, Spain
Villavieja del Lozoya, a municipality in the Community of Madrid, Spain

Other places
Castle of Buitrago del Lozoya, a castle located inside the walls of Buitrago del Lozoya, Madrid, Spain
Lozoya (river), a river flowing near the centre of Spain

See also
Losoya (disambiguation)

Spanish-language surnames